The Alvinellidae are a family of small, deep-sea polychaete worms endemic to hydrothermal vents in the Pacific Ocean. Belonging to the order Terebellida, the family contains two genera, Alvinella and Paralvinella; the former genus contains two valid species and the latter eight. Members of the family are termed alvinellids.

The family was first described in 1979 after discoveries made off the Galápagos Islands by the crew of the DSV Alvin. The ship subsequently lent its name to the family and genera within it.

The worms build mucus tubes and extend red feathery gills. Members of the Alvinellidae are noted for their exceptional heat tolerance: one species, the Pompeii worm (Alvinella pompejana), is thought to be the most heat-tolerant complex organism on Earth. Unlike other (chemosynthetic) vent-dwelling worms, alvinellid worms possess a digestive tract. However, they do rely on an episymbiotic relationship with thermophilic bacteria; hair-like growths of the bacteria living on the worm's back are thought to offer thermal protection to the worm.

Family Alvinellidae 

Genus Alvinella
 Species Alvinella caudata
 Species Alvinella pompejana – Pompeii worm
Genus Paralvinella
 Species Paralvinella bactericola
 Species Paralvinella fijiensis
 Species Paralvinella grasslei
 Species Paralvinella hessleri
 Species Paralvinella palmiformis
 Species Paralvinella pandorae
 Species Paralvinella sulfincola
 Species Paralvinella unidentata

References

Terebellida
Animals living on hydrothermal vents